Bekir Sıtkı Sezgin (1936–1996), also written as Bekir Sıdkı Sezgin, was a musician in the Turkish classical style.

Life
In 1959, Sezgin passed the entrance exam needed to join TRT's İzmir Radio, and began to work in this organization as an "accomplished musician". The same year, he achieved the position of soloist performer with the title of "first class vocal performer". Sezgin retired from the TRT in 1980.

See also 
 List of composers of classical Turkish music

References

Composers of Ottoman classical music
Composers of Turkish makam music
1936 births
1996 deaths